Myophosphorylase or glycogen phosphorylase, muscle associated (PYGM) is the muscle isoform of the enzyme glycogen phosphorylase and is encoded by the PYGM gene. This enzyme helps break down glycogen (a form of stored carbohydrate) into glucose-1-phosphate (not glucose), so it can be used within the muscle cell. Mutations in this gene are associated with McArdle disease (myophosphorylase deficiency), a glycogen storage disease of muscle.

Structure 
PYGM is located on the q arm of chromosome 11 in position 13.1 and has 20 exons. PYGM, the protein encoded by this gene, is a member of the glycogen phosphorylase family and is a homodimer that associates into a tetramer to form the enzymatically active phosphorylase A. It contains an AMP binding site at p. 76, two sites involved in association of subunits at p. 109 and p. 143, and a site believed to be involved in allosteric control at p. 156. Its structure consists of 24 beta strands, 43 alpha helixes, and 11 turns. PYGM also has the following modified residues: N-acetylserine at p. 2, phosphoserine at p. 15, 2014, 227, 430, 473, 514, 747, and 748, and N6-(pyridoxal phosphate)lysine at p. 681. There is a post-translational modification in which phosphorylation of Ser-15 converts phosphorylase B (unphosphorylated) to phosphorylase A. Alternative splicing results in multiple transcript variants.

Function 

Phosphorylase is an important allosteric enzyme in carbohydrate metabolism. This gene, PYGM, encodes a muscle enzyme involved in glycogenolysis. PYGM has a cofactor, pyridoxal 5'-phosphate, that aids this process. PYGM is located in the cytosol, extracellular exosome, and the cytoplasm. Highly similar enzymes encoded by different genes are found in liver and brain.

Catalytic activity 
Glycogen phosphorylase catalyses the following reaction:

((1→4)-alpha-D-glucosyl) (n) + phosphate = ((1→4)-alpha-D-glucosyl) (n-1) + alpha-D-glucose 1-phosphate

Clinical significance

A myophosphorylase deficiency is associated with Glycogen storage disease type V (GSD5), also known as "McArdle disease".

A case study suggested that a deficiency in myophosphorylase may be linked with cognitive impairment. Besides muscle, this isoform is present in astrocytes, where it plays a key role in neural energy metabolism. A 55-year-old woman with McArdle disease has expressed cognitive impairment with bilateral dysfunction of prefrontal and frontal cortex. Further studies are needed to assess the validity of this claim.

Additionally, mutations in the genes for myophosphorylase along with deoxyguanosine kinase have been associated with muscle glycogenosis and mitochondrial hepatopathy. The G456A PYGM mutation and duplication in exon 6 of dGK that results in a truncated protein have been associated with phosphorylase deficiency in muscle, cytochrome c oxidase deficiency in liver, severe congenital hypotonia, hepatomegaly, and liver failure. This expands on the current understanding of McArdle disease and suggests that this combination of mutations could result in a complex disease with severe phenotypes.

Interactions 
PYGM has been shown to have 64 binary protein-protein interactions including 21 co-complex interactions. PYGM appears to interact with PRKAB2, WDYHV1, PYGL, PYGB, 5-aminoisatin, 5-nh2_caproyl-isatin, PHKG1, PPP1CA, PPP1R3A, DEGS1, SET, MAP3K3, INPP5K, PACSIN3, CLASP2, NIPSNAP2, SRP72, LMNA, TRAPPC2, DNM2, IGBP1, SGCG, PDE4DIP, PPP1R3B, ARID1B, TTN, INTS4, FAM110A, TRIM54, TRIM55, WWP1, AGTPBP1, POMP, and CDC42BPB.

References

External links 

 

Transferases
EC 2.4.1